Hoyt House may refer to:

in the United States (by state then town)

Hoyt-Scott House, Point Arena, California, listed on the National Register of Historic Places (NRHP) in Mendocino County
Benjamin Hait House, Stamford, Connecticut, also known as Hoyt House, NRHP-listed
Hoyt-Barnum House, Stamford, Connecticut, NRHP-listed
Lyman and Asenath Hoyt House, Lancaster, Indiana, NRHP-listed in Jefferson County
Benjamin Hoyt House, Cambridge, Massachusetts, NRHP-listed
Hoyt-Shedd Estate, Lowell, Massachusetts, NRHP-listed
E. S. Hoyt House, Red Wing, Minnesota, NRHP-listed
 Hoyt House (Thompson Falls, Montana), NRHP-listed in Sanders County
Samuel P. Hoyt House, Hoytsville, Utah, NRHP-listed in Summit County